"Torch of Liberty" is a song by Japanese rock band Kana-Boon. It was released as the band's sixteenth major-label single, released on November 25, 2020 through Ki/oon Music. "Torch of Liberty" was used as the second opening theme song for the second season of the anime series Fire Force.

Background
On September 26, 2020, the official website for the Fire Force anime announced the opening and ending themes for the second cour of the second season of the anime, with Kana-Boon performing the opening theme. Kana-Boon's singer and guitarist Maguro Taniguchi also produced the ending theme "Desire" by Pelican Fanclub.

On writing the song, Taniguchi commented that "liberation" was the main theme of the song, due to "liberation" and flames being a major theme within the series, and signifying lost freedoms and everyday life.

Release and reception
The single was released on November 25, 2020 in three releases, a standard edition, a first pressing limited edition, and an anime limited edition release. The first pressing limited edition contains a bonus DVD with footage of the band performing live at the "Kana-Boon's "Pre" Best Live" event on July 26, 2020. The anime limited edition contains artwork from the anime, the anime size bonus tracks, as well as a bonus DVD containing the creditless version of the respective opening theme of "Fire Force", as well as the music video for "Torch of Liberty". The single was made available to stream on October 17, 2020.

The single reached number 38 on the Oricon charts, and reached 38 on the Billboard Japan Top Singles Sales.

Music video
The music video for "Torch of Liberty" was released on November 13, 2020, and directed by Hiroki Nakamura. The video is shot in the 4:3 aspect ratio, with retro-style titles and filters used throughout the video, and heavily utilises overhead and birds-eye view shots. The video starts with Maguro Taniguchi playing the guitar on grass, and then the band playing their instruments in various locations, and in front of mirrors. Sweeping pans of various people are shown alongside various items, such as a red car, inflatable pool, and a drone. Various sources of light, such as a flare, car headlights, an open fire, and a torch, are shown interspersed in the video.

Track listing

Charts

Release history

References

External links
 

2020 singles
2020 songs
Kana-Boon songs
Anime songs
Ki/oon Music singles
Animated series theme songs